Zarqa University (Arabic: جامعة الزرقاء) is a university in the city of Zarqa, in Jordan's Zarqa Governorate. It was established in 1994, about 6 km to the east of the city center. At the university's first academic semester, there were only 150 students. In the scholastic year 2013/2014 the number of students was over 9,000 in 43 majors.

The university campus houses the headquarters of the General Secretariat of the Colleges of Computing and Information Society of the Association of Arab Universities. It is also the permanent residence of the general secretariat of the International Arab Conference on Information Technology (ACIT).

Colleges
 Faculty of Science and Information Technology 
 Faculty of Allied Medical Sciences  
 Faculty of Economy and Management 
 Faculty of Arts 
 Faculty of Educational Sciences 
 Faculty of Shari'a (Islamic Studies) 
 Faculty of Nursing 
 Faculty of Law 
 College of Pharmacy 
 Faculty of Engineering 
 Faculty of Arts and Design 
 Faculty of Graduate Studies 
 Faculty of Journalism and mass communication Graduate

References

External links
 http://zu.edu.jo/EN

 
Educational institutions established in 1994
Research institutes in Jordan
1994 establishments in Jordan
Universities in Jordan